Lou Harrison composed in a wide array of musical styles and for various ensembles. The following list is all of his compositions sorted by both genre and chronology.

Works

Chamber works
Adagio (c. 1934-36) for flute, harmonium, strings, and piano
Adagio (c. 1934-36) for flute, two mandolins, guitar, and cello
Aubade for Gabriel (c. 1934-36) for chorus, strings, and percussion
The Geography of Heaven (1935) for 4 violins, 2 violas, 2 celli, 2 basses, and quarter-tone organ
Waterfront - 1934 (1935) for percussion ensemble
Midnoon (1936) for strings and harp
Concerto for Flute and Percussion (1939) for flute and percussion ensemble
Suite for Percussion (1942) for five percussionists 
The Perilous Chapel (1948), mixed quartet
Solstice (1949), octet (flute, oboe, trumpet, 2 cellos, string bass, celesta, tack piano)
Suite for Cello and Harp (1949)
Seven Pastorales (1949 - 1951) for chamber orchestra
Concerto for Organ with Percussion Orchestra (1951) for percussion ensemble, organ and ensemble
Songs in the Forest (1951), mixed quartet
Praise for the Beauty of Hummingbirds (1951) for mixed quintet
Serenado Por Gitaro (1952) for guitar solo
Concerto for Violin and Percussion Orchestra (1959)
Concerto in Slendro (1961)
At the Tomb of Charles Ives (1963) for chamber orchestra
Pacifika Rondo (1963) for chamber orchestra
Serenade for Guitar with optional Percussion (1978) for mixed duo, guitar solo
String Quartet Set (1978)
Suites for Cello and String Orchestra (1984, rev. 1990)
Varied Trio (1986) for rice bowls, violin, vibraphone, and piano (written for the Abel-Steinberg-Winant Trio)
Ariadne (1987), flute and percussion
Grand Duo (1988) for violin and piano
Suite for Violoncello and Piano (1995)
New First Suite for Strings (1995) for string orchestra
Rhymes with Silver (1996) for violoncello, ensemble and mixed quintet
Concerto for Pipa with String Orchestra (1997) for pipa and string orchestra
Suite for Violin with String Orchestra (1997)
Scenes from Nek Chand (2002) for guitar solo

Orchestral works
Fore-piece to St. George or After the Dragon (1934-36) for orchestra
[untitled] (1936) for orchestra
Overture for a Tragic, Heroic Drama (1936) for orchestra
Fugue (1937) for orchestra
Symphony No. 2 'Elegiac''' (1942)Canticle #6 (1942)Symphony On G (No. 1) (1947)Political Primer (1947) for solo baritone, choir and orchestraSuite from Marriage at the Eiffel Tower (1961)Music for Violin with Various Instruments, European, Asian, and African (1967), string solo and orchestraSymphony No. 3 (1982) For the Cabrillo Music FestivalPiano Concerto (1983–85), for piano tuned in Kirnberger #2 (a form of well temperament) and orchestraLast Symphony (No. 4) (1990, rev. 1995)A Parade for MTT (1995)

Vocal worksMass to Saint Anthony (1939), mixed chorus and ensembleAlma Redemptoris Mater (1949–51), low voice and ensembleVestiunt Silve (1951), for soprano and four instrumentsAir from Rapunzel (1952-3), high voice and ensembleStrict Songs (1955), baritone solo, chorus and chamber orchestraOrpheus (1969), soloists, mixed chorus and ensembleLa Koro Sutro (1970), mixed chorus and gamelan, mixed chorus and ensembleThe Foreman's Song Tune (1983) for chorus and Javanese gamelanKetawang Wellington (1983) for voice and Javanese gamelanThree Songs (1985), men's chorus and ensemble

Keyboard worksAdagio (1934-36) for piano soloChoral (1934-36) for organ soloChoral Preludes (1934-36) for clavichordDance (1934-36) for two pianosDance for a Little Girl (1934-36) for piano soloFeelingly (1934-36) for piano soloGothic Piece (1934-36) for harpsichord soloThree Dances of Conflict for Carol Beals (1936) for piano soloProject No. 2 (1936) for piano soloGround in E Minor (1936) for piano soloHill-Rise (1936) for piano soloTribunal (1936) for piano four-handsSonata #1 (1936) for piano soloSonata #2 (1937) for piano soloSlow (1937) for organ soloSimphony for Organ (1937) for organ soloA Bit of Rotten Chopin on Order of J. Cleghorn (1937) for piano soloOpening Dance (1937) for piano soloR. A. H.'s Extatic Moment (1937) for piano soloThird Sonata for Piano (1938) for piano soloUsonian Set (1939) for piano soloReel (Homage to Henry Cowell) (1939) for piano soloExposition of a Cause (1941) for piano soloMusic for the River-Mechant's Wife (1942) for piano soloGigue and Musette (1943) for piano soloSix Sonatas for Cembalo (1943) for piano (or harpsichord) soloSerenade in C (1944) for piano soloA 12-Tone Morning After to Amuse Henry (1944-45) for piano soloWaltz in C (1945) for piano soloTriphony (1945) for piano soloPraises for Michael the Archangel (1946-47) for organ soloHomage to Milhaud (1948) for piano soloLittle Suite for Piano (1949) for piano soloChorales for Spring (1951) for piano soloIo and Prometheus (1951) for piano soloDouble Canon (to Carl Ruggles) (1951) for piano soloFestival Dance (1951) for two pianosA Thought on the Anniversary of Katherine Litz and Charles Oscar (1951) for piano soloA Little Gamelon for Katherine Litz to Teach By (1952) for piano soloWaltz for Evelyn Hinrichsen (1978) for piano (or harp) soloEstampie (1981) for organ soloA Summerfield Set (1988) for piano (or harpsichord) soloPedal Sonata (1989) for organ solo

Gamelan worksSuite for Violin with American Gamelan (1973)Gending Samuel (1976) for Javanese gamelanGending Pak Cokro (1976) for Javanese gamelanBuburan Robert (1976) for Javanese gamelanLancaran Daniel (1976) for Javanese gamelanLagu Sociseknum (1976) for Javanese gamelanGending Paul (1977) for Javanese gamelanGending Jody or Lancaran Jody (1977) for Javanese gamelanMusic for the Turning of a Sculpture by Pamela Boden (1977) for Javanese gamelanMain Bersama-Sama (Playing Together) (1978) for Gamelan Degung and french hornSerenade for Betty Freeman and Franco Asseto (1978) for Gamelan Degung and sulingThrenody for Carlos Chavez (1979) for Gamelan Degung and violaGending Bill or Gending William Colvig (1980) for Javanese gamelanLancaran Samuel (1981) for Javanese gamelanGending Alexander (1981) for Javanese gamelanLadrang Epikuros (1981) for Javanese gamelanGending Hephaestus (1981) for Javanese gamelanGending Hermes (1981) for Javanese gamelanGending Demeter (1981) for Javanese gamelanGending in Honor of the Poet Virgil (1981) for Javanese gamelanDouble Concerto (1981–82) for violin, cello and Javanese gamelanGending Claude (1982) for Javanese gamelanLancaran Molly (1982) for Javanese gamelanGending Dennis (1982) for Javanese gamelanGending Pindar (1982) for Javanese gamelanGending in Honor of Herakles (1982) for Javanese gamelanBeyond the Far Blue Mountains (1983) for Javanese gamelanGending Vincent (1983) for Javanese gamelanGending in Honor of James and Joel (Devotions) (1983) for Javanese gamelan and two sulingLagu Lagu Thomasan (1983) for Cirebon gamelanLagu Cirebon (1983) for Cirebon gamelanLagu Victoria (1983) for Cirebon gamelanFor the Pleasure of Ovid's Changes (1983) for Javanese gamelanGending in Honor of Sinan (1983) for Javanese gamelanGending in Honor of Palladio (1983) for Javanese gamelanLagu Elang Yusuf (1984) for Cirebon gamelanGending in Honor of Max Beckmann (1984) for Javanese gamelanGending Ptolemy (1984) for Javanese gamelanLadrang in Honor of Pak Daliyo (1984) for Javanese gamelanLagu Pa Undang (1985) for Gamelan degungConcerto for Piano and Javanese Gamelan (1986–87)Round for Jafran Jones (1991) for Balinese gamelan

OperaRapunzel (1952)Young Caesar'' (1970)

References

External links
Lou Harrison: Middle Period Works
Lou Harrison artist page from Frog Peak Music site

Lists of compositions by composer